York County (2016 population 99,411) is located in west-central New Brunswick, Canada. The county contains the provincial capital, Fredericton. Outside the city, farming and forestry are two major industries in the county, which is bisected by the Saint John River. The Southwest Miramichi River flows through the northern section of the county.

History
York County was established in 1785, named after the second son of King George III, Prince Frederick-Augustus (1763-1827), who was made Duke of York in 1784. By 1831, the top half was highly populated, due to the rich soil in the region, so it was split off to become Carleton County.

Census subdivisions

Communities
There are eleven municipalities within York County (listed by 2016 population):

First Nations
There are two First Nations reserves in York County (listed by 2016 population):

Parishes
The county is subdivided into fourteen parishes (listed by 2016 population):

Demographics

Population trend

Mother tongue (2016)

Transportation

Major Highways

Protected areas and attractions

Notable people

See also
List of communities in New Brunswick

References

External links

York County Guide

 
Counties of New Brunswick